HADHA may refer to:

 Long-chain 3-hydroxyacyl-coenzyme A dehydrogenase deficiency
 HADHA, enzyme